Epigastric arteries can refer to:
 Superficial epigastric artery
 Superior epigastric artery
 Inferior epigastric artery